Agnieszka Radwańska defeated Petra Kvitová in the final, 6–2, 4–6, 6–3 to win the singles tennis title at the 2015 WTA Finals. This marked the first time since 2005 that the Tour Finals champion did not win a major in the corresponding year.

Serena Williams was the three-time reigning champion, but withdrew due to injury.

Garbiñe Muguruza, Flavia Pennetta and Lucie Šafářová made their debuts at the event.

For the first time since the round-robin format was re-introduced in 2003, both finalists reached the final despite losing two matches in the round-robin stage.

This year marked the first time since 2006 that all participating players came from European countries.

Seeds

Alternates

Draw

Finals

Red group

White group

References
Main Draw

2015 Singles
Finals